It's All in the Game is an album by tenor saxophonist Eric Alexander. It was recorded in 2005 and released by HighNote Records.

Recording and music
The album was recorded at the Van Gelder Studio on July 29, 2005. It was produced by Todd Barkan. The quartet are tenor saxophonist Eric Alexander, pianist Harold Mabern, bassist Nat Reeves, and drummer Joe Farnsworth. Three of the tracks are Alexander originals: "Typhoon 11", "Open and Shut" (a minor blues), and "Little Lucas" (named for Alexander's son).

Release and reception

It's All in the Game was released by HighNote Records. The AllMusic reviewer concluded that "Eric Alexander is a clear winner with It's All in the Game."

Track listing
All compositions by Eric Alexander except where noted
"Where or When" (Richard Rodgers, Lorenz Hart) – 7:05
"Typhoon 11" – 6:51
"Where Is the Love" (Ralph MacDonald, William Salter) – 6:30
"It's All in the Game" (Charles G. Dawes, Carl Sigman) – 5:51
"Open and Shut" – 8:27
"Ruby, My Dear" (Thelonious Monk) – 7:54
"Little Lucas" – 5:20
"Bye Bye Baby" – 5:30

Personnel
Eric Alexander – tenor saxophone
Harold Mabern – piano
Nat Reeves – bass
Joe Farnsworth – drums

References

2005 albums
Eric Alexander (jazz saxophonist) albums
HighNote Records albums
Albums recorded at Van Gelder Studio